Michelle Jacques (born 1965) is a Canadian curator and educator known for her expertise combining historical and contemporary art, and for her championing of regional artists. Originally from Ontario, born in Toronto to parents of Caribbean origin, who immigrated to Canada in the 1960s, she is now based in Saskatoon, Saskatchewan.

Education 
Jacques studied at Queen's University in Kingston, Ontario, where she obtained a B.A. in art history and psychology, and at York University, where she earned her M.A.

Career 
Jacques worked at the Art Gallery of Ontario for a number of years, holding positions including Assistant Curator of Contemporary Art and Acting Curator of Canadian Art. She was the Director of Programming at the Centre for Art Tapes in Halifax, Nova Scotia from 2002 to 2004. In 2012, she was named as the Chief Curator of the Art Gallery of Greater Victoria (AGGV). Jacques was named Head of Exhibitions & Collections/Chief Curator at Remai Modern in Saskatoon in 2020.

At the AGGV, she curated exhibitions of the work of contemporary artists including Carol Sawyer, Rodney Sayers and Emily Luce, Gwen MacGregor, and Hiraki Sawa, among others; and co-curated retrospective exhibitions of the work of the Canadian artists Anna Banana and Jock Macdonald. In the 2019 exhibition Unformable Things, she examined the work of Emily Carr alongside her Canadian contemporaries.

Jacques has taught writing and curatorial topics at institutions including NSCAD University, the University of Toronto Mississauga, and OCAD University.

She has also served on the board of numerous visual art organizations including Vtape, the Feminist Art Gallery and Mercer Union. In 2019, she was appointed as the inaugural vice-president, inclusion and outreach, of the Association of Art Museum Curators, a New York-based group that supports and promotes curatorial work around the world.

In 2021, she was one of the participants in John Greyson's experimental short documentary film International Dawn Chorus Day.

Critical and curatorial writing 
As an extension of her curatorial practice, Jacques has authored and co-authored numerous exhibition catalogues. She has also published essays, reviews, and interviews in magazines. This includes serving as a board member, writer, and a contributing editor at Fuse Magazine; and submissions to Chatelaine, Canadian Art, and Public Journal, among others. A selection of Jacques' publications include:

 Gathie Falk: Life & Work (Toronto: Art Canada Institute, 2022), 
 Howie Tsui: retainers of anarchy (Vancouver, BC: Vancouver Art Gallery, 2017), co-edited by Jacques, Diana Freundl, and Michelle S. Gewurtz 
 Catalogue of a travelling exhibition held at the Vancouver Art Gallery, the Ottawa Art Gallery, and the Art Gallery of Greater Victoria.
 In another place, and here (Victoria, BC: Art Gallery of Greater Victoria, 2015), - co-authored with Toby Lawrence and Gabrielle Moser
 Carole Sabiston: everything below all of the above (Victoria, BC: Art Gallery of Greater Victoria, 2014), co-authored with Patricia E. Bovey
 Jock Macdonald: evolving form (London, UK: Black Dog Publishing, 2014), co-authored with Linda Jansma and Ian M. Thom
 Introducing Suzy Lake (London, UK: Black Dog Publishing, 2014), with contributions from Georgiana Uhlyarik, Jacques, and others
 This publication comprehensively addresses Suzy Lake's artistic production in performance, photography and video from the late 1960s on.
 In 2015 it received an art publication award from Galeries Ontario Galleries.
 Laurel Woodcock (Waterloo, ON: University of Waterloo Art Gallery, 2012), co-authored with Dave Dyment and others 
 This exhibition brought together the work of eight artists: Nadia Huggins, O'Neil Lawrence, Mike Andrew McLean, Meryl McMaster, Troy Moth, Dawit Petros, Krista Belle Stewart, and Li Xinmo, to explore relationships between geography, politics, identity-and photography.
 Shary Boyle: flesh and blood (Montréal: Galerie de l'UQAM, 2010), - co-authored with Louise Déry and others
 A bilingual publication highlighting the drawing, painting, sculpture, audio-visual performance and installations of Toronto-based artist Shary Boyle, which explores explore various human psychological and emotional states through a fictional fantasy world. This travelling exhibition was held at the Art Gallery of Ontario, in Toronto, Ontario; Galerie de l'UQAM, in Montreal Quebec; and the Contemporary Art Gallery, in Vancouver, British Columbia.

Juried art competitions 
Jacques has sat as a juror on numerous art competitions. Recent examples include:

 The Scotiabank Photography Award, 2021
 The Salt Spring National Art Prize, 2021
 The Hnatyshyn Foundation Awards for Canadian Visual Artists and Curators, 2019
 Middlebrook Prize for Young Canadian Curators, 2019
 AIMIA | AGO Photography Prize, 2011

Awards
 2022 The Hnatyshyn Foundation Awards for Canadian Visual Artists and Curators

References 

1965 births
Canadian art curators
Living people
Canadian women curators
People from Toronto
Queen's University at Kingston alumni
York University alumni
Academic staff of the University of Toronto
Academic staff of NSCAD University
Academic staff of OCAD University
Canadian art educators